1906 in Argentine football saw Alumni regaining the Argentine championship for the 6th time in seven seasons. The team also won the local Copa de Honor Municipalidad de Buenos Aires and internationals Tie Cup and Copa de Honor Cousenier, obtaining four titles within the same year.

San Isidro, Argentino de Quilmes and San Martín made their debuts in Primera.

Primera División

The 1906 championship was expanded to include 11 teams. The teams were split into two groups with each team playing the others in their group twice. The two group winners played in a championship decider.

Group A

Group B

Championship final

Lower divisions

Primera B
Champion: Estudiantes (BA) II

Primera C
Champion: Gimnasia y Esgrima (BA)

Domestic cup

Copa de Honor Municipalidad de Buenos Aires
Champion: Alumni

Final

International cups

Tie Cup
Champion:  Alumni

Final

Copa de Honor Cousenier
Champions:  Alumni

Finals

Argentina national team
Argentina national team won their first trophies, on 15 August 1906 they won 3–2 against Uruguay in Montevideo to win the 2nd edition of Copa Lipton, in October they defeated Uruguay again to win the inaugural Copa Newton.

Copa Lipton

Final

Copa Newton

Final

Friendly matches

References

 
Seasons in Argentine football